Don Pasquale is a 1940 Italian comedy film  directed  by Camillo Mastrocinque and starring Armando Falconi, Laura Solari and Maurizio D'Ancora. It is loosely based on Giovanni Ruffini's libretto for Gaetano Donizetti's  opera buffa Don Pasquale. It was screened at the 8th Venice International Film Festival.

Plot
In eighteenth-century Rome, Don Pasquale Corneto, very miserly, wishes his young nephew Ernesto, dedicated to an expensive social life, to marry a rich spinster, both to save on the expenses of her maintenance and to increase the family wealth. Ernesto, however, is in love, reciprocated, with Norina, a beautiful and brilliant singer of the "Pallacorda" theater, but fears, if it were known, of being disinherited. Faced with his resistance, the uncle then decides to take a wife himself and asks his doctor, Doctor Malatesta, to find him an available girl.

The Doctor and Ernesto agree to propose Norina to him, presenting her as Sofronia, naive nephew of the doctor who has just come out of a boarding school. But Norina, anything but naive, manages to get the elderly miser to sign a marriage contract that makes her the owner of all his possessions. Meanwhile, Ernesto, to make Norina jealous, pretends to woo Arianna. Finally, when Don Pasquale discovers that the marriage contract is invalid, in order to free himself from the headaches and expenses that the young woman is causing him, he finally agrees to the marriage between Ernesto and Norina.

Cast

 Armando Falconi as Don Pasquale
 Laura Solari as  Norina/ Sofronia
 Maurizio D'Ancora as  Ernesto
 Greta Gonda as  Arianna
 Franco Coop as Dr. Malatesta
  Fausto Guerzoni as  Remigio
 Diana Torrieri as  Zelinda 
 Marcello Giorda  as Notary
  Aristide Baghetti as  Liborio
 Nico Pepe as  Sebastiano, The Painter
 Elio Steiner as  Fabrizio
  Gino Sabbatini as  The Abbot
  Giuseppe Pierozzi as  Tancredi
  Giuseppe Zago as   Olimpio
 Oreste Bilancia as Cicisbeo #1
 Nino Eller as  Cicisbeo #2
 Claudio Ermelli as Cicisbeo  #3
  Annette Ciarli as Girl at the Theatre
 Pina Renzi as  A Commoner

References

External links

Italian comedy films
1940 comedy films
1940 films
Films based on operas
Italian black-and-white films
Films set in the 18th century
Films directed by Camillo Mastrocinque
Films scored by Alessandro Cicognini
1940s Italian films